Natalie Ann Allison Avellino (born 15 December 1970) is a retired Australian netballer, and former assistant coach of the Southern Steel netball team in the ANZ Championship. She made the Australia national netball team from 1994 to 1995 and again from 2004 to 2006 which included key competitions like one world championships and one Commonwealth Games. She was an Australian Institute of Sport scholarship holder.

Domestically, Avellino played for three Australian Commonwealth Bank Trophy teams, Adelaide Ravens, Sydney Sandpipers and the Sydney Swifts. In 2004 she fell out with Netball Australia and was drafted to New Zealand playing for Southern Sting in the National Bank Cup, a team which won seven out of ten of the National Bank Cup titles (1999–2004, 2007) as a backup shooter for Donna Wilkins and Tania Dalton who later got injured.

Avellino played for the Sting until 2007 when she retired to become the Southland Netball coach in the National Provincial Championships. She recently took Southland to the National Provincial Champs, where they won the National title for the first time in 49 years after previously being big contenders in the 1950s. She has since been announced as the new Southern Steel co-coach and will work with former Otago Rebels coach and current New Zealand under 21 mentor Janine Southby. They replace Robyn Broughton who had coached the Steel for the previous four seasons, and all ten years in the National Bank Cup with the Southern Sting.

Avellino has also worked in New Zealand media. She is a netball writer for The Southland Times, and worked for Sky Television as a commentator during the ANZ Championship from 2008 to 2011. She will give up the microphone in 2012 though, because of her Steel commitments.

On 14 July 2000, Avellino was awarded the Australian Sports Medal for contributions to netball as player.

References

Australian netball coaches
Southern Steel coaches
Australian Institute of Sport netball players
Netball players at the 2006 Commonwealth Games
Commonwealth Games silver medallists for Australia
Recipients of the Australian Sports Medal
1970 births
Living people
Commonwealth Games medallists in netball
Australia international netball players
Sydney Swifts players
Sydney Sandpipers players
Adelaide Ravens players
Australian expatriate netball people in New Zealand
ANZ Championship coaches
Australian netball commentators
Garville Netball Club players
Esso/Mobil Superleague players
South Australia state netball league players
1995 World Netball Championships players
Southern Sting players
Medallists at the 2006 Commonwealth Games